HD 181433 c is an extrasolar planet located approximately 87 light-years away in the constellation of Pavo, orbiting the star HD 181433. This planet is at least 0.64 times as massive as Jupiter and takes 962 days to orbit the star at an orbital distance of 1.76 astronomical units (AU), or 263 gigametres (Gm). François Bouchy et al. have published a paper detailing the HD 181433 planetary system in Astronomy and Astrophysics.

References

External links 
 

HD 181433
Pavo (constellation)
Exoplanets discovered in 2008
Giant planets
Exoplanets detected by radial velocity